"Fool's Gold" is a song written by Timmy Tappan and Don Roth, and performed by American country music artist Lee Greenwood.  It was released in August 1984 as the second single from his album You've Got a Good Love Comin'.  The single peaked at number 3 on the U.S. country charts and number 5 in Canada.

Chart performance

References
 
 

1984 singles
Lee Greenwood songs
MCA Records singles
Song recordings produced by Jerry Crutchfield
1984 songs